John William Black (August 12, 1899 – January 14, 1968) was a professional baseball player.  He was a second baseman for one season (1924) with the Chicago White Sox.  For his career, he compiled a .200 batting average in 5 at-bats.

He was born and later died in Philadelphia, Pennsylvania at the age of 68.

External links

1899 births
1968 deaths
Chicago White Sox players
Major League Baseball second basemen
Baseball players from Pennsylvania
Minor league baseball managers
Suffolk Nuts players
Portsmouth Truckers players
Suffolk Wildcats players
Beaumont Exporters players
Toledo Mud Hens players
Minneapolis Millers (baseball) players
Nashville Vols players
Birmingham Barons players
Albany Senators players